Alexander George Oliver Sims (born 15 March 1988, in London) is a British professional racing driver, currently competing in the IMSA SportsCar Championship for Whelen Engineering Racing. Previously Sims has driven in the ABB FIA Formula E Championship for Mahindra Racing and BMW i Andretti Motorsport, winning one race in Saudi Arabia.

Sims was the winner of the 2008 McLaren Autosport BRDC Award for promising young British drivers.

Career

Karting
Sims' kart racing career started in 1998 when he started competing in club competitions. In 2000, Sims had a successful campaign, he won the Super 1 MSA Cadet Championship, the Kartmasters Grand Prix, the 5 Nations Cup and came second in the Champions of The Future British Cadet Championship. Sims latterly added the JICA British Championship, the Monaco Kart Cup, three British Grands Prix and the Formula A World Championship, before moving into single-seaters in 2006.

Formula Renault
Having started his car racing career in late 2006, Sims scored a second place in his first ever car race in the Formula Renault UK 2.0 Winter Series, before finishing ninth in the championship standings. In 2007, Sims raced in the main series with Manor Competition. He finished eighth overall, after taking one win at Donington Park, and second places at Brands Hatch and Thruxton. He also forayed into the French and Northern European Cup championships during the season and added his first pole position in the category, at Val de Vienne during the French championship. Sims also contested the 2007 UK Winter Series, but failed to finish in three of the four races.

Sims remained with Manor Competition in Formula Renault UK for 2008, and challenged for the championship. Finishing every race, Sims actually scored the most points over the course of the championship, with 473. However, Formula Renault UK employs a points system that means that a driver must drop their two worst scores over the season. Unfortunately for Sims, his worst scores were a pair of ninths worth 24 points, and Adam Christodoulou, his main championship rival dropped two retirements. Thus, a 24-point swing resulted in Christodoulou turning a one-point deficit into a 23-point championship win. He also contested the final round of the Formula BMW Pacific in Macau, finishing eighth with the fastest lap. In December 2008, Sims won the McLaren Autosport BRDC Award.

Formula Three

At the 2008 Autosport Awards ceremony, Sims announced his plans to race with German team Mücke Motorsport in the Formula 3 Euro Series. In a season dominated by Jules Bianchi, Sims took fourth place in the championship, with a win at the Nürburgring and four second places. He also took part in two rounds of the International Formula Master series, with two fourth places at the Hungaroring being his best results. For 2010, Sims would move to ART Grand Prix.

Sports car racing

In 2012, Sims drove a Lola-Judd LMP2 for Status Grand Prix at the 24 Hours of Le Mans and two rounds of the European Le Mans Series.

He joined Hexis Racing in 2013 to compete at the Blancpain Endurance Series with a McLaren MP4-12C, partnering with Álvaro Parente and Stef Dusseldorp.

In 2014 and 2015, Sims raced at the British GT Championship for Ecurie Ecosse with a BMW Z4.

The Brit competed at the 2016 Blancpain GT Series for Rowe Racing with a BMW M6, winning the 24 Hours of Spa.

In 2017 he competes at the GT Le Mans class of the IMSA SportsCar Championship with a factory BMW M6.

Sims competed in two races of the 2018–19 FIA World Endurance Championship for BMW Team MTEK.

Formula E

In May 2017, Sims was present at the Monaco ePrix as a stand-by option for Robin Frijns. Later that month, he was announced as a development driver for MS Amlin Andretti for the 2017-18 season. He would join BMW for Season 5, partnering Antonio Felix Da Costa. At the final race of the season at the 2019 New York City ePrix Sims claimed pole position and the first podium of his Formula E career finishing 2nd. Returning with BMW for the 2019–20 Formula E season, Sims won his first race in Formula E at race 2 of the 2019 Diriyah ePrix.

In August 2020, it was announced that Sims would replace Jerome D’Ambrosio at Mahindra Racing for the 2020–21 Formula E season, who retired from competitive racing to become deputy team principal at Venturi Racing. Sims ended the season with a podium in the 2021 Rome ePrix, five point scoring finishes, and 54 points, enough for 19th at the end of the year standings. For 2022, Sims would stay with Mahindra, but this time partnered by Oliver Rowland.

Racing record

Career summary

† As Sims was a guest driver, he was ineligible for points.
* Season still in progress.

Complete Formula 3 Euro Series results
(key) (Races in bold indicate pole position) (Races in italics indicate fastest lap)

† Driver did not finish the race, but was classified as he completed over 90% of the race distance.
‡ As Sims was a guest driver, he was ineligible for championship points.

Complete Auto GP results
(key) (Races in bold indicate pole position; races in italics indicate fastest lap)

Complete GP3 Series results
(key) (Races in bold indicate pole position) (Races in italics indicate fastest lap)

Complete FIA Formula 3 European Championship results
(key) (Races in bold indicate pole position) (Races in italics indicate fastest lap)

‡ As Sims was a guest driver, he was ineligible for championship points.

Complete European Le Mans Series results
(key) (Races in bold indicate pole position) (Races in italics indicate fastest lap)

Complete 24 Hours of Le Mans results

Complete British GT Championship results
(key) (Races in bold indicate pole position) (Races in italics indicate fastest lap)

Complete Blancpain GT Series Sprint Cup results

Complete IMSA SportsCar Championship results
(key) (Races in bold indicate pole position) (Races in italics indicate fastest lap)

Complete FIA World Endurance Championship results
(key) (Races in bold indicate pole position; races in italics indicate fastest lap)

Complete Formula E results
(key) (Races in bold indicate pole position; races in italics indicate fastest lap)

References

External links 

Official website

1988 births
Living people
Sportspeople from London
People educated at Stamford School
English racing drivers
British Formula Renault 2.0 drivers
Formula 3 Euro Series drivers
Formula Renault 2.0 NEC drivers
French Formula Renault 2.0 drivers
Formula Renault 2.0 WEC drivers
Formula Renault Eurocup drivers
GP3 Series drivers
British Formula Three Championship drivers
24 Hours of Daytona drivers
24 Hours of Le Mans drivers
FIA Formula 3 European Championship drivers
Blancpain Endurance Series drivers
24 Hours of Spa drivers
British GT Championship drivers
WeatherTech SportsCar Championship drivers
Formula E drivers
Formula BMW Pacific drivers
International Formula Master drivers
Auto GP drivers
European Le Mans Series drivers
FIA World Endurance Championship drivers
Manor Motorsport drivers
SG Formula drivers
Team Meritus drivers
Mücke Motorsport drivers
ART Grand Prix drivers
Charouz Racing System drivers
Double R Racing drivers
Status Grand Prix drivers
Motopark Academy drivers
T-Sport drivers
Carlin racing drivers
Ecurie Ecosse drivers
Hitech Grand Prix drivers
Rowe Racing drivers
BMW M drivers
Rahal Letterman Lanigan Racing drivers
Andretti Autosport drivers
Mahindra Racing drivers
Corvette Racing drivers
TOM'S drivers
Karting World Championship drivers
Nürburgring 24 Hours drivers
Action Express Racing drivers